The Hopkins statistic (introduced by Brian Hopkins and John Gordon Skellam) is a way of measuring the cluster tendency of a data set. It belongs to the family of sparse sampling tests. It acts as a statistical hypothesis test where the null hypothesis is that the data is generated by a Poisson point process and are thus uniformly randomly distributed. A value close to 1 tends to indicate the data is highly clustered, random data will tend to result in values around 0.5, and uniformly distributed data will tend to result in values close to 0.

Preliminaries

A typical formulation of the Hopkins statistic follows.
Let  be the set of  data points.
Generate a set  of  uniformly randomly distributed data points.
Define two distance measures,

Definition
With the above notation, if the data is  dimensional, then the Hopkns statistic is defined as:

Under the null hypotheses, this statistic has a Beta(m,m) distribution.

Notes and references

External links
 http://www.sthda.com/english/wiki/assessing-clustering-tendency-a-vital-issue-unsupervised-machine-learning

Clustering criteria